Batanes: Sa Dulo ng Walang Hanggan, or more popularly known as Batanes, is a 2007 drama film directed by Adolfo Alix, Jr. and John David Hukom. The film is a joint project by Ignite Media, Inc. and GMA Pictures. It stars Iza Calzado and Taiwanese superstar Ken Chu of F4 (which is also from Meteor Garden, playing the role of Xi Men). Batanes is the first Filipino film of Ken Chu and gave Joem Bascon his first award, bagging the Breakthrough Performance by an Actor given by the Golden Screen Awards. The movie was produced by GMA Pictures.

Plot
It was a whirlwind romance when Pam meets Ivatan Rico in Manila. She decides to give up her meaningless, stressful city life and follow him to Batanes to meet his parents Boy and Lydia and marry him. The sea immediately intimidates Pam and shows its power, telling her how, with the strong toss of its waves, it can end everything.

Pam tries to adapt to the Ivatan way of life. Pam starts hating the sea that Rico loves so much. Despite all these adjustments, Pam is happy with her new life and with Rico. But everything changes when Rico does not return from fishing. Pam is devastated. She blames no one but the sea. Realizing that she cannot continue living in Batanes without Rico, Pam decides to leave. But before boarding the boat, she realizes that the sea is laughing at her defeat, so Pam decides to stay but she still cannot forget Rico.

On the anniversary of her husband's death, Pam sails to the Ivujos Island. She gets stranded on the island by an angry storm. She then sees a man lying face down in the sand. For a moment, she thinks it is Rico but it turns out to be a Taiwanese, Kao. She administers to his wounds and brings down his fever. When the storm breaks, she drags Kao to her boat and takes him back with her. The villagers are reluctant to accept the Taiwanese, especially Manuel and Boy since most Taiwanese fishermen fish illegally in the waters of Batanes. As Pam takes care of Kao, she starts to be drawn towards him. She starts to feel that he is a kindred soul.

Language and cultural difference are no barriers as emotions rise. Love surfaces anew. Batanes provides the breathtaking backdrop to their poignant love story. Will their love win over? Or will their past haunt them and eventually separate them? Essentially a picturesque romance, Batanes also explores the intimate portrait of a woman's relationship with the ocean.

In the end, Kao was deported to Taiwan due to help from the local government. Pam eventually loved the ocean more.

Cast and characters
 Iza Calzado as Pam
 Ken Chu as Kao
 Joem Bascon as Rico
 Bembol Roco as Boy
 Daria Ramirez as Lydia
 Sid Lucero as Manuel
 Glaiza de Castro as Melanie
 Coco Martin as Jason
 Mike Tan as Noel
 Julio Diaz as Fred
 Aleth dela Cruz as Gloria 
 Pacifico Agor	as the taxi driver
 Armand Reyes as the hotel supervisor
 Anna Lyn Tan	as hotel receptionist
 Maxie Evangelista as Arnel

Production
Arleen Cuevas, line producer of Ignite Media, told that Adolfo Alix, Jr. directed a film included for the Cinemalaya Philippine Independent Film Festival called Kadin. Kadin was shot in Batanes. Ms. Cuevas also said that Alix fell in love with the place that caused him to approach Ignite Media saying that he wanted to make a film in Batanes because of its romantic setting.

Adolfo Alix, Jr. shared that the role of Pam was originally offered to Judy Ann Santos. Santos was interested to be part of the film but her commitments caused her not to accept the offer. Santos referred Iza Calzado to Adolfo Alix, Jr. After meeting Calzado, they saw that the actress can do "light moments" although Iza always portrays a character in heavy dramas and eventually, Iza got the role. According to an article, in case Calzado did not accept the offer, they may have had approached Jennylyn Mercado.

Dave Hukom, on the other hand, said that they were just looking for any Taiwanese actor for the role of Kao. Arlene Cuevas also did not expect that they would be able to get Ken Chu for the role of Kao. She said that she has a friend who is a producer in Hong Kong so she approached her friend to seek help to get any Chinese actor who is willing to work in the Philippines. The producer replied that they were offering Ken Chu a project before that was to shoot in the Philippines but was not able to push through. After sending the script to Chu, his assistant replied after four to five days saying that they are interested to be part of the film.

Accolades

References

External links

External links
 

Philippine drama films
GMA Pictures films
2000s Tagalog-language films
Films set in Batanes
Films directed by Adolfo Alix Jr.